Bulgarian-French  relations are foreign relations between Bulgaria and France.  Diplomatic relations between both countries were established on July 8, 1879. They were enemies in World war 1 and 2. But the present they have very good relationship. Bulgaria is a full member of the Francophonie since 1993.
Both countries are full members of the European Union and NATO.
French president Nicolas Sarkozy helped in the liberation of the Bulgarian nurses who had been framed in the HIV trial in Libya.

Resident diplomatic missions
 Bulgaria has an embassy in Paris.
 France has an embassy in Sofia.

See also  
 Foreign relations of Bulgaria 
 Foreign relations of France
 Bulgarians in France

External links 
  Bulgarian embassy in Paris (in French only)
  French Foreign Ministry about relations with Bulgaria
  French embassy in Sofia (in French and Bulgarian only)

 
France
Bilateral relations of France